Cherokee (also known as Cherokee Village) is an unincorporated community in southern Grainger County, Tennessee.

References

Unincorporated communities in Grainger County, Tennessee
Unincorporated communities in Tennessee